Kim Eun-sun may refer to:

Kim Eun-sun (footballer) (born 1988), South Korean footballer
Kim Eun-sun (conductor) (born 1980), South Korean conductor and music director